Jalalabad Ragib-Rabeya Medical College (JRRMC) is a private medical school in Bangladesh, established in 1995. It is located in the Pathantula area of Bimanbandar Thana, in Sylhet. It is affiliated with Shahjalal University of Science and Technology (SUST) under the School of Medical Sciences. The college is associated with 925-bed Jalalabad Ragib-Rabeya Medical College Hospital.

History
Industrialist Ragib Ali and his wife, Rabeya Khatun Chowdhury, established Jalalabad Ragib-Rabeya Medical College in 1995. The medical college is located at Tarapur Tea Estate

Campus
The college is located in the Pathantula area of Bimanbandar Thana, in Sylhet. On the  campus are three main buildings: two ten-story academic buildings and the associated six-story, 925-bed, Jalalabad Ragib-Rabeya Medical College Hospital.

Organization and administration
The college is affiliated with Shahjalal University of Science and Technology (SUST) under the School of Medical Sciences. The chairman of the college is Ragib Ali. The principal is Prof. Dr. Abed Hossain.

Academics

Undergraduate
The college offers a five-year course of study, approved by the Bangladesh Medical and Dental Council (BMDC), leading to a Bachelor of Medicine, Bachelor of Surgery (MBBS) degree from SUST. After passing the final professional examination, there is a compulsory one-year internship. The internship is a prerequisite for obtaining registration from the BMDC to practice medicine. In October 2014, the Ministry of Health and Family Welfare capped admission and tuition fees at private medical colleges at 1,990,000 Bangladeshi taka (US$25,750 as of 2014) total for their five-year courses.

Admission for Bangladeshis to the MBBS programme at all medical colleges in Bangladesh (government and private) is conducted centrally by the Directorate General of Health Services (DGHS). It administers a written multiple choice question exam simultaneously throughout the country. Candidates are admitted based primarily on their score on this test, although grades at Secondary School Certificate (SSC) and Higher Secondary School Certificate (HSC) level also play a part. Seats are reserved, according to quotas set by the Directorate General of Health Services (DGHS), for children of Freedom Fighters and for students from underprivileged backgrounds. Admission for foreign students is based on their SSC and HSC or equivalent grades. As of July 2014, the college is allowed to admit 190 students annually.

Postgraduate
The college offers postgraduate study recognised by the Bangladesh College of Physicians and Surgeons (BCPS). It offers postgraduate degree in following subjects:
Internal Medicine 
Otolaryngology  
Dermatology
General Surgery 
Psychiatry 
Physical Medicine
Obstaetrics & Gynaecology
Pathology 
Paediatric Surgery
Paediatrics
Orthopaedics 
Radiology & Imaging
Ophthalmology
Cardiology

Journal 
Jalalabad Medical Journal is the official journal of the college. It is an open access journal, published semi-annually in January and July. It accepts original research articles, review articles on topics of current interest, and interesting case reports. Submissions should not have been published previously, and should not be submitted to multiple publications concurrently.

See also
 List of medical colleges in Bangladesh

References

External links
 

Medical colleges in Bangladesh
Education in Sylhet
Hospitals in Bangladesh
Educational institutions established in 1995
1995 establishments in Bangladesh